Wellington Recreation Football Club (also known as Wellington Rec) is a Northern Irish, intermediate football club, based in Larne, County Antrim, playing in Division 1C of the Northern Amateur Football League.

Wellington Rec also maintain a reserve team, currently managed by former player Matthew Holden, Marc Weir and Bobby Colborn. 

The club was formed in the 1950s as A.E.I.: the football team associated with the AEI engineering company's factory in Larne. It joined the Amateur League in 1959. In 1973, the club was renamed G.E.C. after the company of that name took over the AEI factory. Then, in 1993, when GEC closed down its factory in Larne, the club was reformed under its current name and was allowed to retain its status and position in the Amateur League.

References

External links
 nifootball.co.uk - (For fixtures, results and tables of all Northern Ireland amateur football leagues)

 

Association football clubs in Northern Ireland
Association football clubs in County Antrim
Northern Amateur Football League clubs
Larne